Softape is a Apple // software company that published computer games, utilities and productivity programs for the Apple II family of computers in the late 1970s and early 1980s. It was co-founded by William V. R. Smith, Bill Depew and Gary Koffler. in 1980 the name was changed to Artsci Inc, a California Corporation.  The decline of Sofware sales on TAPE instigated the name change.  Artsci is still in Business in 2022. See www.artscipub.com

Softape's Software Exchange newsletter, Softalk, was started in 1979 as a club newsletter (2 Editions). Its success caused Softape to look for partners to handle a Monthly format Magazine. Enter Margot Comstock and Al Tommervik in 1980 and the new group re-designed it into the Apple II enthusiast magazine Softalk.

Software
Softape published at least 20 games for the Apple II:

Cypher Bowl for Atari 400/800 by William Depew (1981)
Crazy Eights by William Smith (1979)
Solitaire Poker by William Smith (1979)
Fighter Pilot by Steve Baker (1978)
Go-moku by Steve Baker (1979)
Photar by Steve Baker (1981), originally called Nightcrawler
Microgammon by Steve Baker
Burn-Out by Steve Baker
Bubbles by Steve Baker
Planetoids by Steve Baker
Baker's Trilogy by Steve Baker; includes Bubbles, Burnout and Planetoids
Star Mines by Steve Baker (1983)
Apple 21 by Bill DePew (1978)
Draw Poker by Ken Labaw (1981)
Crossword by Jim and Vicki Neville (1980)
Crazy Eights by Bill Smith (c. 1979)
Craps by Roger Walker (1979)
Pro Golf I by Jim Wells (1979)
Roulette by Roger Walker (1979)
Bomber by Bob Bishop (1979)
Forte by Gary Shannon (1980)
AppleTalker by Bob Bishop (1979)
AppleLis'ner by Bob Bishop (1979)
TicTacTalker by Bill Depew (1979)
Jupiter Express Gary Shannon (1979)
Talking Calculator by Bob Bishop (1980)

References

 The History of Softape / Artsci
  The History of Softape / Artsci: Softalk (magazine)

Defunct software companies of the United States
Defunct video game companies of the United States